Gonyaulax is a genus of dinoflagellates with the type species Gonyaulax spinifera (Claparède et Lachmann) Diesing. Gonyaulax belongs to red dinoflagellates and commonly causes red tides. It secretes a poisonous toxin known as "saxitoxin" which causes paralysis in humans.

Structure 
Gonyaulax is a genus of dinoflagellates that are aquatic organisms with two separate flagella: one extends backward and the other wraps around the cell in a lateral groove helping to keep the organism afloat by rotational motility. The plate formula in the genus Gonyaulax Diesing was redefined  as Po, 3', 2a, 6", 6c, 4-8s, 5'", 1p, 1"".

Classification 
All species are marine, except for one freshwater species, Gonyaulax apiculata.

It previously included several species, which are now considered to belong to a separate genus, e.g.: 
Gonyaulax tamarensis (now: Alexandrium tamarense) 
Gonyaulax grindleyi (now: Protoceratium reticulatum)
Gonyaulax polyedra (now: Lingulodinium polyedra)

Adaptations 
Gonyaulax dinoflagellates have evolved a type of resting spore (or resting cyst), to enable it to survive harsh weather conditions. Resting cysts can be formed when temperature or salinity changes in the surrounding water. These cysts are round mucous covered bodies that appear reddish in color. Gonyaulax catenella has been recorded forming vegetative cysts in response to cold water.

Reproduction 
Gonyaulax are protists that may grow in long chains, especially when faced with turbulent water conditions. These chains allow for clustering of organisms for increased mating, and protection of weakly swimming organisms that could otherwise be washed away.

Effect on humans 
Although Gonyaulax is predominantly found in seawater, it can also have a detrimental effect on humans. Filter feeding organisms (e.g. mussels, clams, etc.) can accumulate these dinoflagellates in their bodies. When humans eat these shellfish after dinoflagellate accumulation during Red Tide season, usually during the warmer months of the year, it can poison the person who eats it.

Red tide 
Red tide is a discoloration of the sea water by pigmented cells like Gonyaulax spp., some of which may produce toxins. Gonyaulax spinifera has been connected to the production of yessotoxins (YTXs), a group of structurally related polyether toxins, which can accumulate in shellfish and produce symptoms similar to those produced by paralytic shellfish poisoning (PSP) toxins.

References

Further reading

Dinoflagellate genera
Bioluminescent dinoflagellates